The Petite Baïse (literally Little Baïse) is a  long river in the Hautes-Pyrénées and Gers départements, southwestern France. Its source is in Lannemezan, on the plateau de Lannemezan. It flows generally north. It is a right tributary of the Baïse into which it flows in l'Isle-de-Noé.

Départements and communes along its course
This list is ordered from source to mouth: 
Hautes-Pyrénées: Lannemezan, Clarens, Campistrous, Galez, Galan, Sabarros, Tournous-Devant, Vieuzos, Betpouey, Hachan, Puntous, Guizerix 
Gers: Saint-Ost, Ponsan-Soubiran, Aujan-Mournède, Viozan, Lagarde-Hachan, Sauviac, Saint-Élix-Theux, Moncassin, Belloc-Saint-Clamens, Saint-Médard, Idrac-Respaillès, Miramont-d'Astarac, Lamazère, L'Isle-de-Noé

References

Rivers of France
Rivers of Hautes-Pyrénées
Rivers of Gers
Rivers of Occitania (administrative region)